Edin Terzić may refer to:

Edin Terzić (alpine skier) (born 1989), alpine skiing racer who represented Yugoslavia at 1992 Winter Olympics.
Edin Terzić (footballer) (born 1983), German former professional footballer and current football coach.